TMUC may refer to:

 The Miracle Ultraviolence Connection, an American professional wrestling tag team
 The Millennium Universal College, a college in Pakistan